Arjan Swinkels (born 15 October 1984) is a Dutch professional footballer who plays as a centre back for Belgian club Esperanza Pelt.

Club career 
Swinkels made his Eredivisie debut against Roda JC, 18 September 2005. The following season, Swinkels was mostly on the bench, but in the Spring, he began playing regularly. In the last round, he saved a ball on the goalline, which meant that Willem II was safe of relegation. In the new season, Swinkels began playing as centre-back instead of injured Delano Hill. Since then, Swinkels has been a regular starter.

After signing for Lierse in the summer of 2012, Swinkels suffered a long time injury as he tore his Meniscus

On 2 February 2015, Swinkels signed until the end of the season with Dutch Eerste Divisie side Roda JC Kerkrade. With that club he forced promotion to the Eredivisie via the 2015 play-offs, at the expense of NAC Breda. A year later, he contributed to reaching 14th place.

After two seasons at Roda JC, Swinkels did not accept an offer to extend his contract with the club. Instead, he signed a contract in June 2016 until mid-2018 with Beerschot Wilrijk, who had been promoted to the Belgian National Division 1 in Belgium in the previous season. Swinkels immediately helped Beerschot Wilrijk to the Belgian First Division B. There was almost a second promotion in a row for Swinkels with Beerschot Wilrijk, but Cercle Brugge proved too strong in the title matches. After two years in a row having been named "Man of the Season" by fans, Swinkels moved to Mechelen as a free agent. In his first year in Mechelen he had a successful season, becoming champion of the Belgian First Division B and winning the Belgian Cup. His contract was not renewed at the end of his second year. The 35-year-old Swinkels returned to the Netherlands, where he signed a one-year contract with Eredivisie club VVV-Venlo with the option for another year.

On 1 September 2021, he moved to Belgian amateur club Esperanza Pelt.

Honours
Mechelen
 Belgian First Division B: 2018–19
 Belgian Cup: 2018–19

References

1984 births
Living people
Association football defenders
Dutch footballers
Dutch expatriate footballers
Eredivisie players
Eerste Divisie players
Willem II (football club) players
People from Oisterwijk
Lierse S.K. players
Roda JC Kerkrade players
K Beerschot VA players
K.V. Mechelen players
VVV-Venlo players
Belgian Pro League players
Challenger Pro League players
Expatriate footballers in Belgium
Dutch expatriate sportspeople in Belgium
Footballers from North Brabant